Dinotrux is a computer-animated streaming television series based on Chris Gall's series of books by the same name. It features a fictional prehistoric world inhabited by hybrid characters that are part reptile and part mechanical tool called Reptools. The larger ones known as Dinotrux, who are dinosaurs combined with trucks, are accompanied by Rotilian Reptools and other types of smaller ones. The series debuted on August 14, 2015 on Netflix, with the second season following on March 11, 2016, and the third on October 7, 2016, and the fourth on March 31, 2017, and the fifth on August 18, 2017. Beginning on November 10, 2017, subsequent seasons are released under the title Dinotrux Supercharged, with the second season being released on March 23, 2018, and the last season on August 3, 2018.

Plot
A prehistoric world, which is set in the Mechazoic era, is populated by hybrid reptile-tools called Reptools, which include hybrid dinosaur-trucks called Dinotrux. Two best friends, Ty Rux, who is a good Tyrannosaurus Rux, and Revvit, who is a Rotilian Reptool, must team up with other inhabitants of the world to defend their community and their work from an evil T-Trux named "D-Structs". Dinotrux and other Reptools share a symbiotic relationship with one another. For example, Ty provides Revvit with safety, shelter and security, who in turn fixes and maintains Ty when needed.

Characters

 Ty-Rux (voiced by Andrew Francis) is the leader of the Dinotrux. He is a red Tyrannosaurus Trux — half Tyrannosaurus rex and half excavator — with a wrecking ball for his tail. 

 Revvit (voiced by Richard Ian Cox) is a yellow and green Rotilian Reptool — half lizard (resembling a chameleon) and half rotary drill. He is Ty's best friend. His tongue is a tape measure.

 Dozer (voiced by Brian Drummond) is a yellow Dozeratops — half Triceratops and half bulldozer. He is described as a "cranky hothead" but a true friend with a big heart.

 Ton-Ton (voiced by Matt Hill) is a blue Ankylodump — half Ankylosaurus and half dump truck. He is described as a daredevil who "is always ready for non-stop action and loves to tear it up".

 Skya (voiced by Ashleigh Ball) is an orange Craneosaur — half Brachiosaurus and half construction crane. She is described as tough, strong, and sassy.

 Garby (voiced by Trevor Devall) is a green Stegarbasaurus — half Stegosaurus and half garbage truck. He enjoys eating rocks and extracting their ore. He can also shoot his back plates like ninja stars.

 Ace (voiced by Cree Summer) is a silver and blue Wrenchtool – half lizard and half crescent wrench. She is described as very hot-headed. Her middle name is "Wingnut".

 Waldo (voiced by Doron Bell Jr.) is a red Pipe Wrenchtool – half lizard and half pipe wrench.

 Click-Clack (voiced by Fred Ewanuick) is an orange Rotilian Reptool — half lizard (resembling a chameleon) and half rotary drill.

 Xee (voiced by Heather Doerksen) is a Crescent Wrenchtool - half lizard (resembling a chameleon) and half crescent wrench. She was originally solitary before joining the group.

 D-Structs (voiced by Paul Dobson) is a white and black-colored Tyrannosaurus Trux — half Tyrannosaurus rex and half excavator He dislikes failures and the fact that Ty had come to his crater, and rightfully took it from him.

 Skrap-It (voiced by Trevor Devall) is a steel colored Scraptool – half lizard (resembling a Jackson’s chameleon) and half Leatherman multi-tool. He is D-Structs' henchman after he promises to salvage Ty after he is defeated.

 George (voiced by Brian Drummond) is brown Dozeratops — half Triceratops and half bulldozer. He has zen-like approach to life.

 The Tortools are Toolcreatures who are half tortoise and half airbrush/buffer/car jack with paint supplies and sprayers.
 Sea Tortools are aquatic species of Tortools who are half Archelon and half airbrush/buffer/car jack.

 Hex Wrenchtools - half lizard and half hex key - a Swedish subspecies of Reptool that is all named Otto.

 Rollodons are species of Dinotrux who are half steamroller and half Centrosaurus. They are known to roar by shouting out only one word, which is "roll", and are known to be afraid of Reptools.

 The Dumps - Drag-O, Wrecka and Scoot - (voiced by Brian Drummond, Ashleigh Ball and Trevor Devall) are a group of three daredevil Ankylodumps — half Ankylosaurus and half dump truck. They used to be Ton-Ton old group until they parted on unknown terms until they meet each other again.

 Stix (voiced by Eric Bauza) is a green Gluphosaur - half Dilophosaurus and half glue gun.

 Towaconstrictors are Toolcreatures who are half boa constrictor and half tow truck cable. Their tail hooks function similar to rattlesnakes rattles.

 Drillian, Auger, Bore-is and Burrow (voiced by Cree Summer, Eric Bauza and Sam Vincent) are a Drillasaurs - half Nodosaurus and half mining drill with mole-like appearances. They have poor eyesight and are digging diamonds who then are used to polish their drills.

 Flynt (voiced by Eric Bauza) is a Hydrodon - half Iguanodon and half fire truck.

 Chunk and Crunk (voiced by Vincent Tong and Kyle Rideout) are a yellow Cementasaurs - half Pachycephalosaurus and half cement mixer. They convert rocks that they eat into a cement inside their mixer tanks, and can shoot cement out of their tails. Crunk has slight agorophobia (fear of open spaces).

 Prop-Top, Flapjaw, Navs and Washout (voice by Brenda Crichlow, Vincent Tong and Fred Ewanuick) are a Pteracopters - half Quetzalcoatlus and half V-22 Osprey. They have hooks which they can use to attach other Dinotrux and each of them has unique crests who seem inspired by tail rudders.

 Snowblazer (voiced by Heather Doerksen) is a blue Plowasaur - half Chasmosaurus and half snowplow. She has pet rock named Herb.

 Junktools are Toolcreatures who are based on Compsognathus. They are nomads who collect scrap, who then is used to build/upgrade their travelling vehicle.

 Dreadtruxes are species of Dinotrux who are half Dreadnoughtus and half bucket-wheel excavator. They are accordingly a massive Dinotrux larger than any other species ever seen. They hibernate for hundreds of years and wake up only to feed.
Big Dread is a Dreadtrux — half Dreadnoughtus and half bucket-wheel excavator.
Lil'Dread is a young Dreadtrux — half Dreadnoughtus and half bucket-wheel excavator — who befriended Ton-Ton.

 Liftasaurs are species of Dinotrux who are half Corythosaurus and half forklift. They are shown to be stubborn and competitive. They are two known types: blue-crested and yellow-crested who used to fight with each other until Ty and his friends didn't taught them to work with each other.

 Fryttz (voiced by Jason Mckinnon) is a Hydrodon - half Iguanodon and half fire truck. He used to be bullied by Scraptools until Skya taught him confidence.

 Kelper Shellcracker III (voiced by Doron Bell Jr.) is a jamaican accented Crabcavator - half crab and half undersea excavator. Due to losing his previous shell to scraptors, he started to hide in his cave and melting down platinum pearls in order to make a new one, until Trux didn't meet him and maked new shell for him and Dozer didn't taught him that is okay to be scared and admit his fear to others.

 Shredadons are species of Dinotrux who are half Suchomimus and half scrap metal shredder.
 Splitter (voiced by Richard Ian Cox) is a Sawmetradon — half trencher and half Dimetrodon. He is known to terrorize the Woodland Reptools, cutting down trees and looking for woodland ore.

 Blayde (voiced by Kelly Sheridan) is a black and white Dozeratops — half Triceratops and half bulldozer. She used to be friends with Dozer, until an attack by D-Structs caused her to adopt the motto "Take or be taken.".

 Pounder is a Poundersaurolophus — half pile driver and half Parasaurolophus. Instead of speaking, he communicates by clicking and occasionally pounding the ground. Skya's herd was once attacked by one member of his kind.

 D-Stroy (voiced by Brian Dobson) is another white and black-colored Tyrannosaurus Trux – half Tyrannosaurus rex and half excavator – and D-Structs's older brother. He is smart and cunning, and, unlike Ty and his brother, D-Structs, has a pair of horns on his head like a Carnotaurus and slightly longer arms like a Giganotosaurus.

 Goldtrux (voiced by Michael Dangerfield) is golden covered dark green Stegarbasaurus — half Stegosaurus and half garbage truck. He used to be friends with Garby, until he tasted gold and became addicted to it.
 Scrapadactyls are half Leatherman multi-tool and half Pteranodon. Some specimens shown to have crests similar to Tupuxuara.
 Stealth Scrapadactyls are black colored Scrapadactyls who have scanner lasers in their eyes.

 Scraptors are half Leatherman multi-tool and half Velociraptor.
 Desert Scraptors are subspecies of scraptor inhabiting the deserts and canyons. Unlike the main species of scraptors, these scraptors have a pair of horns on their heads like a Carnotaurus.
 Arctic Scraptors are white/silver colored polar variant of their more tropical cousins.

 Shockarachnids are Toolcreatures who are half Mesothelae and half taser

 Aquadons are aquatic species of Dinotrux who are half Nautilus Collecting Machine/remotely operated underwater vehicle and half Mosasaurus. They are very territorial species of Dinotrux who use sliding out shark-like saw-fins on invaders in their territory, and are extremely protective of their sea ore.

 Dyscrapadons are half Leatherman multi-tool and half Dimorphodon.
 Picktools are Reptools who are half lizard and half icepick.

 Slamtools are Reptools who are half lizard and half hammer.

 Dragonflopters are Toolcreatures who are half Meganeura and half helicopter drone.

 Drillapedes are Toolcreatures who are half Arthropleura and half mining drill.
 Bitbugs are mechanical creatures who are half fly and half bit.

 Screwsquitoes are Bitbug creatures who are half mosquito and half screw.

 Washer Wasp are Bitbug creatures who are half wasps and half washer piece.

 Grease Bee are Bitbug creatures who are half bees and half grease maker.
 Lightning Bitbugs are Bitbug creatures who are half firefly and half lightbulb.

 Clamp Clams are half clams and half clamps.

 Gearwigs are Toolcreatures who are half earwig/cockroach and half clamp.

 Buzz is a green Rotilian Reptool — part lizard (resembling a chameleon) and part rotary drill of the same type as Revvit and Click-Clack.

 Bindy is a silver and blue Crescent Wrench Reptool — part lizard and part crescent wrench of the same type as Ace.

 Grouter is a blue Pipe Wrench Reptool — part lizard and part pipe wrench of the same type as Waldo.

Episodes

Production

DreamWorks Animation first optioned rights to Dinotrux in March 2009, a month before the first book was published, with an intention to develop a computer-animated film.

References

External links

  at DreamWorks TV
  at Netflix
 
  (Supercharged)

2010s American animated television series
2015 American television series debuts
2018 American television series endings
2010s Canadian animated television series
2015 Canadian television series debuts
2018 Canadian television series endings
American children's animated adventure television series
American children's animated comedy television series
American children's animated fantasy television series
American computer-animated television series
American television shows based on children's books
Canadian children's animated adventure television series
Canadian children's animated comedy television series
Canadian children's animated fantasy television series
Canadian computer-animated television series
Canadian television shows based on children's books
Animated television series about dinosaurs
Animated television series about robots
Television series by DreamWorks Animation
English-language Netflix original programming
Family Jr. original programming
Fictional robotic dinosaurs
Television shows filmed in Vancouver
Netflix children's programming